Abigail Barlow is an American singer-songwriter from Birmingham, Alabama. Her album The Unofficial Bridgerton Musical, co-written with, and produced by, Emily Bear, won the Grammy Award for Best Musical Theater Album in 2022. She is also known for her independent pop hit “Heartbreak Hotel,” which peaked at #2 on iTunes and has more than 6.5 million streams. She and Bear were honored by the Songwriters Hall of Fame and named to Forbes 30 Under 30 list. She has more than 2.4 million TikTok followers. Barlow has collaborated with Meghan Trainor, who co-wrote and produced a track on Abigail’s self-titled debut EP in 2020 titled Phantom Feelings.

In July 2022, Bear and Barlow performed their Bridgerton album live in concert with the National Symphony Orchestra, conducted by Steven Reineke, at the Kennedy Center. Guest soloists included Ephraim Sykes, Denée Benton and Kelli O'Hara. In late July 2022, Netflix sued Barlow and Bear in U.S. federal court for copyright infringement, claiming that they had objected to live concerts of the album. The company discontinued the lawsuit in September 2022 after a reported settlement.

Also in 2022, Bear and Barlow were engaged by Taco Bell to write the music for Mexican Pizza: The Musical, with a book by Hannah Friedman, which featured Doja Cat and Dolly Parton. The satirical musical's true story concerns a fan-favorite item at Taco Bell, Mexican pizza, which was removed from, and later returned to, its menus. The musical streamed on Taco Bell's TikTok and YouTube accounts on September 15, 2022.

References

Living people
Grammy Award winners
Singer-songwriters from Alabama
Year of birth missing (living people)
American women singer-songwriters